Léopold "Leo" Eyharts (born 28 April 1957) is a French Brigadier General in the French Air Force, an engineer and ESA astronaut. He has flown to space two times as part of a Mir expedition and an International Space Station expedition.

Eyharts was born on 28 April 1957 in Biarritz, Basque Country, France. He graduated as an engineer from the French Air Force Academy of Salon-de-Provence in 1979, and graduated from the École du personnel navigant d'essais et de réception (EPNER) French test pilot school in Istres in 1988.

He launched on board Space Shuttle mission STS-122 to the International Space Station on 7 February 2008, where he joined Expedition 16. He participated in the installation and configuration of the Columbus European laboratory module. He returned to Earth aboard mission STS-123 in March 2008.

Awards and honors
 Chevalier of the Légion d'honneur
 Chevalier of the Ordre national du Mérite
 Médaille d'Outre-Mer
 Silver National Defence Medal
 Cavalier of the Order of Courage (Russia)
 Cavalier of the Order of Friendship (Russia)
 The medal "For merits in development of space" (12 April 2011) for his outstanding contribution to the development of international cooperation in manned space flight

References

External links
 ESA profile page
 Spacefacts biography of Léopold Eyharts

1957 births
Living people
People from Biarritz
French-Basque people
French aviators
French spationauts
ESA astronauts
Crew members of the International Space Station
Chevaliers of the Légion d'honneur
Knights of the Ordre national du Mérite
Recipients of the Order of Courage
École de l'air alumni
French Air Force generals
Space Shuttle program astronauts
Mir crew members